|}

The Lacken Stakes is a Group 3 flat horse race in Ireland open to horses aged three years only.
It is run at Naas over a distance of 6 furlongs (1,206 metres), and it is scheduled to take place each year in late May or early June.

The race was first run, as a Listed race, in 2014.  It was awarded Group 3 status in 2015.

Records
Leading jockey (3 wins):
Ryan Moore – Caravaggio (2017), Sioux Nation (2018), So Perfect (2019)

Leading trainer (4 wins):
 Aidan O'Brien – Due Diligence (2014), Caravaggio (2017), Sioux Nation (2018), So Perfect (2019)

Winners

See also
 Horse racing in Ireland
 List of Irish flat horse races

References
Racing Post:

 horseracingintfed.com – International Federation of Horseracing Authorities – Lacken Stakes (2018).

Flat horse races for three-year-olds
Naas Racecourse
Flat races in Ireland
Recurring sporting events established in 2014
2014 establishments in Ireland